Massive Multiplayer Online Wargame Leveraging the Internet (MMOWGLI) is an online multiplayer game used by the US Navy Office of Naval Research and other U.S. government agencies to perform online wargames in order to study various problems and hypothetical scenarios.

Overview
MMOWGLI was launched by ONR and the Naval Postgraduate School in order to blend gaming and social media tools and to crowdsource solutions. It was initially launched with an application addressing a piracy scenario off the coast of Somalia.  The idea received coverage from national news media. More than 16,000 users registered from various national security communities, academia and the general public.  Round one of MMOWGLI gameplay started on May 31, 2011 with 2,000 players, and resulted in over 800 players registering and exchanging ideas.

See also
 MMORPG
 Government crowdsourcing
 United States Navy

References

External links

Organizational websites
 Official website
 Idea Card Chains Report, Edge Virtual Training Program (evtp). Example of actual game session, with cards, threads and rankings.
 Official Twitter feed
 Update on latest MMOWGLI game article at Modeling, Virtual Environments and Simulation Institute at Naval Postgraduate School. 
 MMOWGLI, article at Institute for the Future website. 
 Youtube video, from ONR

Articles and media coverage
 MMOWGLI: An Experiment in Generating Collective Intelligence, dodlive.mil, April 28, 2011.
 Wannabe SEALs Help U.S. Navy Hunt Pirates In Massively Multiplayer Game, fastcompany.com, May 10, 2011.
 Navy using online game to mine ideas: Exercise is open to active, reserve and civilian forces, By PHILLIP MOLNAR, Herald Staff Writer, 11/04/2013.
 U.S. Navy Uses MMO to Train for Real-World Piracy, gamepolitics.com, May 10, 2011.

Crowdsourcing
United States Navy
Massively multiplayer online role-playing games